Pentecostalism is a renewal movement within Protestant Christianity that places special emphasis on a direct personal relationship with God and experience of God through the baptism with the Holy Spirit. For Christians, this event commemorates the descent of the Holy Spirit upon the followers of Jesus Christ, as described in the second chapter of the Book of Acts.
Pentecostalism was established in Kerala, India at the start of the 20th century.

History 
The Pentecostal message from the West arrived in Kerala in 1909 through the visit of George Berg. This American missionary of German descent arrived in Bangalore in 1909 and preached in a convention in Kerala. The first Pentecostal congregation was formed through the efforts of Berg in Kerala only in 1911; this was among first generation Christians. Berg was the first missionary to reach out to the natives who did not speak English.

In 1913 Pastor Robert F. Cook also came to India as a missionary.  He came to Kerala and began his ministry there in 1914.  By 1923, Cook had established 36 churches in Kerala, known collectively as the South India Church of God (Full Gospel) in India.  Pastor K. E. Abraham, who was associated with Pastor Cook until 1930, was baptized in the Holy Spirit in 1923, an event considered as the foundation for the establishment of the India Pentecostal Church of God. In 1930, Pastor K.E Abraham who believed that local Keralite churches must be independent from foreign organizations for effective evangelization within India, split from Pastor Cook and formed the South India Pentecostal Church of God.  He later changed the name of the church to India Pentecostal Church of God.

In addition to the work begun by Abraham, Pentecostalism grew rapidly in Kerala through the ministries of the Ceylon Pentecostal Mission (CPM), the Church of God (Cleveland), and the Assemblies of God.

Notable communities 
 Indian Pentecostal Church of God (IPC)
 Assemblies of God in India (AG)
 Church of God (Full Gospel) in India (COG)
 The Pentecostal Mission (TPM)
 Glorious Church Of God (Malayam Daiva Sabha)
 Sharon Fellowship Church (SFC)
 New India Church of God (NICOG)
 New India Bible Church (NIBC)
 World Mission Evangelism Church of God (WME)
 The Apostolic Ministries International (TAMI)
 Suvartha Center Church (SCC)
 Malankara Christian Church (MCC)
Church Of God Full Gospel In India Kerala Region
 Karisma Fire Ministries

Population

Christian Denominations in Kerala, 2011

Source: Religious Denominations of Kerala

Pentecostal Youth Associations

Lifestyle

In classical Pentecostalism, the baptism with the Holy Spirit is understood to be a separate and distinct experience occurring sometime after regeneration. Influenced by the Holiness movement, baptism with the Holy Spirit was regarded by the first Pentecostals as being the third work of grace, following the new birth (first work of grace) and entire sanctification (second work of grace).

John Wesley, the founder of the Methodist movement, taught that there were two distinct phases in the Christian experience. In the first work of grace, the new birth, the believer received forgiveness and became a Christian. During the second work of grace, sanctification, the believer was purified and made holy. Wesley taught both that sanctification could be an instantaneous experience, and that it could be a gradual process.

Early Methodists wore plain dress, with Methodist clergy condemning "high headdresses, ruffles, laces, gold, and 'costly apparel' in general". John Wesley recommended that Methodists annually read his thoughts On Dress; in that sermon, John Wesley expressed his desire for Methodists: "Let me see, before I die, a Methodist congregation, full as plain dressed as a Quaker congregation". The 1858 Discipline of the Wesleyan Methodist Connection thus stated that "we would ... ejoin on all who fear God plain dress". 

Outward Holiness, or External Holiness, is a Wesleyan-Arminian doctrine emphasizing modest dress and sober speech. The doctrine was prevalent during the revival movements for the early Lutheran Pietists and Methodists, and during the Holiness and Pentecostal movements. Some Christian denominations within the Wesleyan-Arminian theological tradition, such as some Methodist, Holiness, and Pentecostal denominations continue to observe outward holiness.
The standards are:
Modest and plain dress, which is defined as loose covering from the neck to below the knee in all normal body postures; women often wear a Christian headcovering. This would also include the strict prohibition of mixed bathing. 
Moderate or no use of jewelry or ornaments of gold, silver, and jewels for personal adornment; some denominations will only allow the use of a wedding band or ring while others proscribe it too.
A distinction of the sexes in clothing, forbidding such style as trousers and pant suits for women unless required by work or public service.
Christian men are to wear their hair short and Christian women must never cut or remove their hair, wearing it long in order to have a definitive distinction of male and female sexes.
As a continuation, in Kerala many Traditional Pentecostal denominations do not wear ornaments depending upon the denomination they are part of. However Dr. Valsan Abraham who is the current president of IPC Church has mentioned that removing ornaments is not a part of Biblical doctrine but the forefathers of IPC CHURCH had decided to have a simple lifestyle and the practice of removing ornaments has never ever  recorded in the constitution of IPC and in the statement of faith. Most of the Independent churches in Kerala do not have a practice of removing ornaments. At the turn of the century, more and more traditional churches are moving away from the practice of mandating compulsory removal of ornaments and classifying it as a personal choice of believers.

Pentecostal Institutions in Kerala 
List of some main institutions are :-
 India Bible College & Seminary, Kumbanad
 MT Zion Bible Seminary, Mulakuzha
 Faith Theological Seminary, Manakkala
 Bethel Bible College, Punalur
 Sharon Bible College, Thiruvalla
 Shalom Bible College, Vadavathoor
 IPC Kottayam Theological Seminary, Puthuppally
 Rhema Bible Seminary, Nallur, Palakkad. Accredited by ATA
 Calicut Theological College - Kozhikode
 Asian Bible College - Kochi
 Trinity Bible College Kozhikode, Waynad

Pentecost Media
Media plays a leading role to spread Pentecostalism in Kerala through Television Channels, Radio Channels, Newspapers/Magazines and Social Media.

Resistance of Pentecostalism in Kerala 
The US-based persecution watchdog International Christian Concern (ICC) has learned some attacks on Christians in Kerala, generally considered a safe-haven for Christians because of the large Christian minority there. The ICC warned that the Kerala attacks would only embolden anti-Christian extremists elsewhere to attack the even more vulnerable Christians in their states.

The Vishwa Hindu Parishad along with the Arya Samaj arranged the Ghar Wapsi Program and converted a few number of Christians to Hinduism in Kerala. Because Dalit Christians had belonged to SC/ST communities before conversion to Christianity, but they are denied the government's SC/ST benefits in education and job reservation. The Supreme Court ruled that a person who reconverts from Christianity to Hinduism shall be entitled to reservation benefits if his forefathers belonged to a Scheduled Caste and the community accepts him after reconversion.

International Evangelists in Kerala 
 Billy Graham
American Evangelist Billy Graham came in February 1956, conducted program  in Kottayam in Kerala. Most of the pentecostal Christian homes in Kerala had the wall poster with the side view picture of 36 years old Evangelist Dr. Billy Graham with the writing  "God is Calling The Church”.
 Reinhard Bonnke
German Evangelist Reinhard Bonnke preached in Kochi for the CfaN Fire Conference on April 9-13, 2008.

Malayalee Evangelists outside Kerala 

 MA VARGHESE

Ma Varghese is the senior Pastor of Bethel AG church Bangalore.

 PG VARGHESE

P.G Varghese is the founder of IET Indian Evangelical Team working in North India. They have nearly planted 8000 churches across India.

 ANISON SAMUEL

Anison Samuel is a revival speaker, Pastor and an evangelist who has started his ministry at the age of 12. He is currently the President of The Apostolic Ministries International and the senior Pastor of Zion Apostolic church in Edmonton, Canada. The Apostolic Ministries International have around 1500 churches across the globe. 

 RANJIT  ABRAHAM & V A THAMPY 

Pastor  R  Abraham and  Pastor VA Thampy  are  the  founders  of  New  India Church of  God.

See also
 Christianity
 Christianity in Kerala
 Methodism
 History of Pentecostalism in India
 Pentecost
 The Pentecostal Mission
 K. C. John

References 

Christianity in Kerala
Kerala